Albert Eden Seymour (8 October 1841 – 24 December 1908) was Archdeacon of Barnstaple from 1890 to 1908.

He was educated at Charterhouse and  University College, Oxford. He was Vicar of Chittlehampton from  1890 to 1905; and of Ilfracombe from then until  his death.

References

1841 births
People educated at Charterhouse School
Alumni of University College, Oxford
Archdeacons of Barnstaple
1908 deaths